= Alice Hellfeier =

German footballer (born 1993)

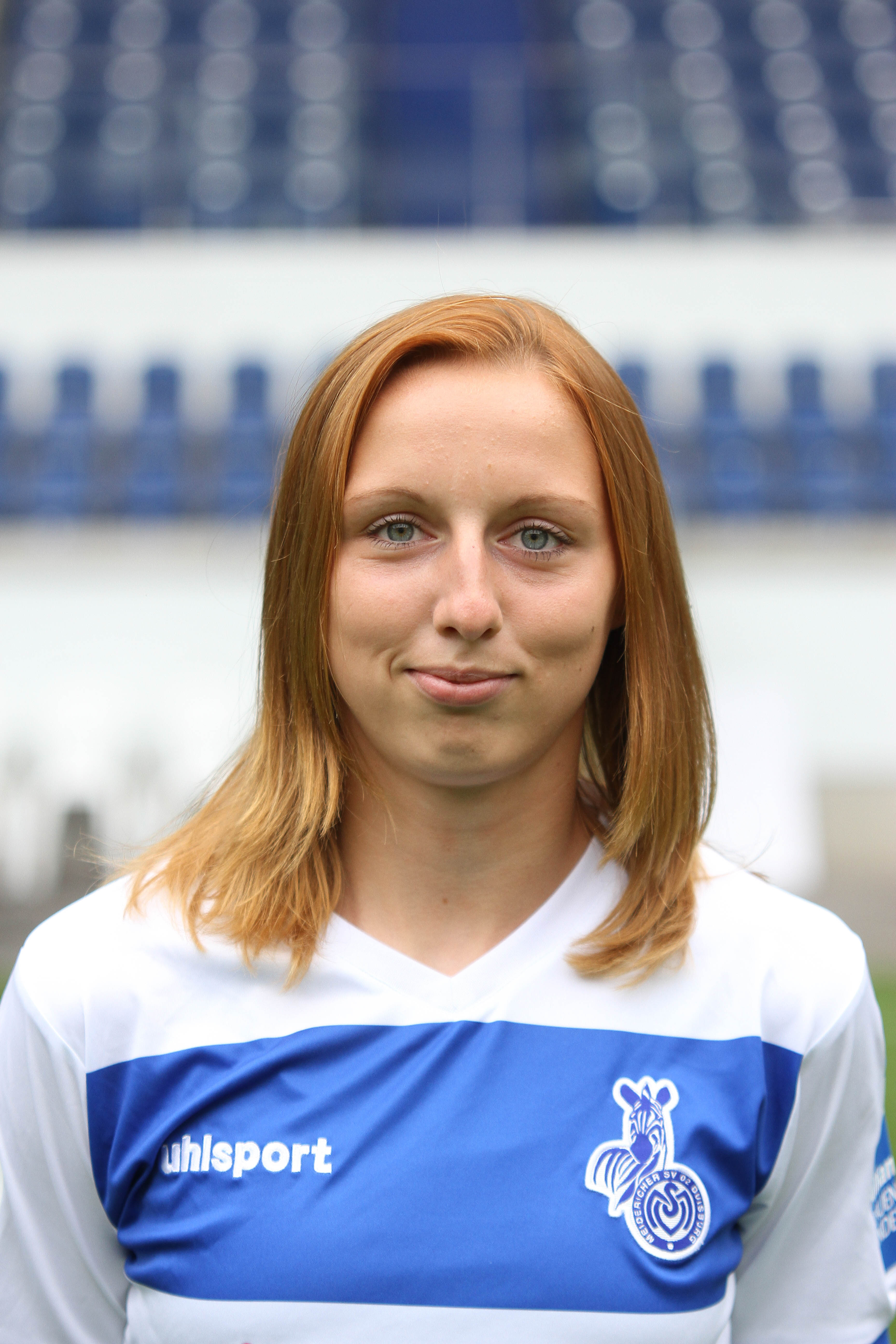
- Hellfeier in 2014

Personal information
- Full name: Alice Rebekka Hellfeier
- Date of birth: 29 October 1993 (age 32)
- Height: 1.76 m (5 ft 9 in)
- Position: Defender

Alice Rebekka Hellfeier (born 29 October 1993) is a German footballer who plays as a midfielder for MSV Duisburg.
